Jean-François Bedenik (born 20 November 1978 in Seclin) is a French football coach and retired footballer who played as a goalkeeper. He is currently working at the academy of  AS Saint-Étienne as a goalkeeper coach.

Career
In 2004, he joined Swiss side Neuchâtel Xamax. In 2006, he moved to Greece, to join Ionikos, where he stayed just one season, before moving to US Boulogne. After three seasons with US Boulogne-sur-Mer the 31-year-old goalkeeper returned to Neuchatel Xamax on a four-year deal.

References

1978 births
Living people
People from Seclin
French footballers
Ligue 2 players
US Boulogne players
Association football goalkeepers
RC Lens players
Expatriate footballers in Switzerland
Ionikos F.C. players
French expatriate sportspeople in Switzerland
Valenciennes FC players
Expatriate footballers in Greece
Le Mans FC players
Vannes OC players
French expatriate sportspeople in Greece
Ligue 1 players
Sportspeople from Nord (French department)
Footballers from Hauts-de-France